"Missing Persons" is the seventh episode of the American crime comedy-drama television series Terriers. The episode was written by Jed Seidel, and directed by Michael Zinberg. It was first broadcast on FX in the United States on October 20, 2010.

The series is set in Ocean Beach, San Diego and focuses on ex-cop and recovering alcoholic Hank Dolworth (Donal Logue) and his best friend, former criminal Britt Pollack (Michael Raymond-James), who both decide to open an unlicensed private investigation business. In the episode, Hank and Britt try to find more about an amnesiac, which also unleashes a chain of events. Meanwhile, Steph's condition worsens.

According to Nielsen Media Research, the episode was seen by an estimated 0.444 million household viewers and gained a 0.2/1 ratings share among adults aged 18–49. The episode received extremely positive reviews from critics, who praised the character development and the performances.

Plot
Hank (Donal Logue) starts spending more time with Steph (Karina Logue), who still constantly mentions their mother. Later, Hank and Britt (Michael Raymond-James) arrive at their diner to handle a situation: a man has locked himself in the restroom. They confront the man (Noel Fisher), who turns out to be amnesiac.

While Britt suggests just leaving the man alone, Hank wants to help, as he finds similarities between him and Steph. They take him to the beach to meet with a former doctor, Johnson (Richmond Arquette), as they found a pill on the man's clothes. He explains that the pill is used against malaria, but it can also cause some memory loss and other side effects. They take the amnesiac to the police station. The man then flees from the station when he sees a bulletin reporting a missing girl. Mark also discloses that the lab reported the drugs as rohypnol. Meanwhile, Steph leaves the house and starts befriending some of the neighbors, including a child. Britt's relationship with Katie (Laura Allen) is dwindling and she refuses to talk about it, making him also distant from the cases.

Hank and Britt decide to find the missing girl, Jessica Sampson. Her college roommate tells them that she planned to leave for Cambodia before disappearing. Using their contacts, they discover that she planned to leave with a man named Adam Fisher, who bought the plane tickets. They visit Adam's house, finding Jessica (Olivia Dawn York) bound and gagged in a closet. The police have finally identified the amnesiac as Adam. As Hank still investigates more about Adam, Steph has a breakdown when she discovers that her encounters with the child were just hallucinations, causing some disturbance in the neighborhood.

The police calls Hank when Adam is doing a hostage situation, keeping Jessica's roommate in her apartment. Hank easily fends off Adam, allowing the roommate to flee the scene. He confronts Adam for his actions, breaking him down. The police takes Adam into custody. Hank talks with Steph, promising to help her. He takes her to Country Villa Pines, a psychiatric hospital, paying with some of Lindus' bearer bonds. Hank agrees to constantly visit her, in contrast to her previous hospitals.

Reception

Viewers
The episode was watched by 0.444 million viewers, earning a 0.2/1 in the 18-49 rating demographics on the Nielson ratings scale. This means that 0.2 percent of all households with televisions watched the episode, while 1 percent of all households watching television at that time watched it. This was a 13% decrease in viewership from the previous episode, which was watched by 0.506 million viewers with a 0.2/1 in the 18-49 rating demographics.

Critical reviews
"Missing Persons" received extremely positive reviews from critics. Noel Murray of The A.V. Club gave the episode a "B+" grade and wrote, "As with last week's Terriers, I have a few quibbles with 'Missing Persons'. I was excited about the case-of-the-week when it started — especially since we were back to one of those cases that Hank and Britt just stumble into — but it didn't have as many unexpected twists and clever legwork as past Terriers cases, and while I appreciate that it tied thematically to our overarching character-plots, to me the ties were too close. Having a client's problems so fully encapsulate the problems that Hank and Steph are going through just seems way too neat for my taste."

Alan Sepinwall of HitFix wrote, "The amnesia case is a pretty standard private eye trope, going back to the '30s and '40s, and as with the adultery case from episode three, the Terriers writers did a good job of dressing up the old girl for the 21st century. As with most things about this show, it started off low-key, even funny at times, and then went darker and darker as the hour moved along."

Matt Richenthal of TV Fanatic gave the episode a 4.7 star rating out of 5 and wrote, "Indeed, Hank is a troubled man, but watching him sort through his messes every week is a pleasure. This was yet another example of how well Terriers balances the dark with the light, the action with the emotion." Cory Barker of TV Overmind wrote, "For the second straight week, Terriers dips into the standalone pool with a story that intensely mirrors the lives of the lead characters. While last week's case mirrored Britt and Katie's relationship,'Missing Persons' focuses on Hank and Steph, to almost the same amount of effectiveness. There is some risk in continuing to go down that road, but thus far, Terriers has nailed it, particularly because of the performances from the actors."

References

External links
 

2010 American television episodes
Terriers episodes